Finn Alastair Russell (born 23 September 1992) is a Scottish professional rugby union player who primarily plays fly-half for Racing 92 in the Top 14. He has also represented Scotland at international level, having made his test debut against the United States during the 2014 Summer Internationals. Russell has previously played for the British & Irish Lions during their tours of New Zealand in 2017 and South Africa in 2021.

Early life and education
Russell was born into a sporting family. His father played a lot of racket sports, and worked in sports administration, including as Director of Domestic Rugby for the Scottish Rugby Union. His grandparents were international badminton players, his uncle and great-grandfather played Cricket for Scotland  and his brothers are also noted rugby players.

Russell started playing rugby in Wallace High School in Stirling. Russell did not feel drawn to academic work. After secondary school, he pursued an apprenticeship for three years as a stonemason, in a business owned by a family friend, whilst his rugby developed.

Playing career

Early years
Russell initially played rugby at Stirling County, but in 2011 moved to second-flight Falkirk to improve his chances of first XV club rugby.

In 2012 Russell played at centre for Scotland at the World Rugby U20 Championships.

Russell was selected to play for Ayr after the IRB Championship tournament, helping them win the league and cup double in the 2012–13 season of the Scottish Premiership.

Russell joined Glasgow Warriors in 2012, but was injured in his first season.

Club

New Zealand

In 2013 Russell received the John Macphail Scholarship, linked with New Zealand's Lincoln University, spending 15 weeks in New Zealand's South Island playing for local clubs in the Christchurch area. He benefited from the facilities and specialist coaching offered by the Canterbury Rugby Football Union international high performance unit.

Glasgow Warriors
Russell returned to Glasgow for the 2013/14 season. With Glasgow's top players away on international duty for the 2013 Six Nations Championship, Russell was named on the bench to face Zebre on 10 February 2013 as part of the 2012–13 Pro12 season, coming onto the field and making his professional debut at the 56th minute of the game. During the 2013–14 Pro12 season, Russell made his first start at the club, starting at Inside Centre against the Newport Gwent Dragons at Scotstoun Stadium on 22 November 2013. Glasgow Warriors Head Coach Gregor Townsend offered Russell a full-time contract with the club that began in the 2014–15 season.

2014–15 also saw Russell play a prominent role in Glasgow Warriors' Pro12 title triumph. In the final match of the regular season, his personal points haul of 22 (including two tries) contributed to the bonus-point victory over Ulster needed to secure a home play-off. The following week, against the same opposition, Russell's pass to D. T. H. van der Merwe in the 75th minute resulted in a try, tying the score at 14–14. Russell then stepped up to slot home the decisive conversion from a wide angle to send Glasgow into the final.

In the Final at Belfast's Ravenhill Stadium, Russell was again among the try scorers as Glasgow won their maiden title, also kicking four conversions in the 31–13 victory over Munster.

Racing 92
On 29 November 2017, it was announced that Russell would leave Glasgow Warriors at the end of the 2017–18 season to play in France's Top 14 with Racing 92, where he was to replace All Blacks legend Dan Carter after the latter's move to Japan.

In December 2022 it was announced that Russell will join Bath Rugby after the 2023 Rugby World Cup.

International career

Scotland
Russell earned his first call-up to the senior national team during Scotland's summer 2014 tour of North America, where he started in the matches against the United States and Canada. That autumn, he started in all three of Scotland's November Tests against Argentina, New Zealand and Tonga.

In 2014, Russell had what Scottish sportswriter Andy Newport called "a meteoric rise [that] saw the former Stirling County youngster blast his way into the national team in the space of six months."

Russell established himself as Scotland's first-choice Number 10 during the 2015 Six Nations Championship, starting four of the team's five matches.  He missed the defeat to Italy through suspension, his sin-binning against Wales having been upgraded to a two-week ban following a citation (and unsuccessful appeal). Russell scored his first international try in the final day defeat to eventual champions Ireland.

Russell was selected in Scotland's 31-man squad for the 2015 Rugby World Cup, and scored a try in the team's opening match victory over Japan.

The summer of 2017 began with Russell as part of Scotland's Southern Hemisphere tour. He created two tries in the opening match win over Italy in Singapore, and followed this with a try of his own a week later during victory over Australia.

Russell played in all five of Scotland's 2018 Six Nations Championship fixtures. During the 25-13 victory over England, he threw an audacious pass on his own 22-yard line as part of an attack leading to a try scored by Sean Maitland. This piece of skill was subsequently described by many pundits as being one of the greatest of all-time.

Russell played in four of Scotland's 2019 Six Nations Championship fixtures, missing the match against France due to injury.  He scored a try and two conversions and played pivotal role in Scotland's come back against England to earn a 38-38 draw.

Russell played in three of Scotland's group matches at the 2019 Rugby World Cup scoring a try in the loss to Japan, as Scotland failed to qualify to the quarter finals.

British & Irish Lions
Following an instrumental man-of-the-match performance for Scotland against Australia in Sydney, Russell was called up to the 2017 British & Irish Lions tour to New Zealand. He made a brief mid-week appearance during the 31-31 draw with Super Rugby champions Hurricanes as replacement for Dan Biggar who had sustained a head injury, becoming Lion number #835.

Following a sustained period of good form for club and country, Russell was selected in the 37-man squad for the 2021 British & Irish Lions tour to South Africa. His first Lions points came when he slotted four conversions in the 7-54 victory over the Cell C Sharks. Following an achilles tendon injury that kept him out of the first two Tests, he was selected on the bench for the decisive third Test match, coming on to the field after only 11 minutes to kick 11 pointsand producing a breathtaking performance that many saw as a coming of age for Russell, with former England scrum half Matt Dawson stating, “if he was an All Black, you’d be saying he’s the next Dan Carter, he’s that good”.

Barbarians
In 2018, Finn Russell was capped with the Barbarians against England during the mid-year rugby tests. He scored 19 points (1 try and a 7/7 kicking conversions), allowing his team to beat England 45–63 at Twickenham. England had never conceded so many points in their stadium.

International statistics

Personal life
After secondary school, Russell worked for three years as a stonemason. He recalled that time in a 2015 interview with Newport:

On rainy days it could be pretty miserable. . . . It could be tough but I enjoyed it. I'd be making windowsills, door frames, fire places – even building walls. But compared to playing rugby, it's night and day. If I ever have a bad day at training, I think back to what it was like working in that cold shed.

Russell has been nicknamed 'Russell the Muscle' due to having a somewhat slender build for a modern-day rugby player, and has also been given the moniker 'White Chocolate' by teammate Simon Zebo.

Russell has been in a relationship with Emma Canning, a Scottish heptathlete, since 2017.  In November 2022 Canning gave birth to the couple's first child, a daughter.

References

External links
 
profile  at Scottish Rugby

1992 births
Ayr RFC players
Falkirk RFC players
Glasgow Warriors players
Racing 92 players
Living people
Rugby union players from Stirling
Rugby union fly-halves
Scotland international rugby union players
Scottish rugby union players
Scottish stonemasons
Stirling County RFC players
British & Irish Lions rugby union players from Scotland
Barbarian F.C. players
People from Bridge of Allan